This is a list of all mammals currently found in the U.S. state of Alaska, whether resident or as migrants. With 112 mammal species, Alaska ranks 12th of the 50 U.S. states in mammalian diversity. Not included in this list is the Steller's sea cow, an extinct sirenian that was once native to Alaska's Aleutian Islands before being hunted to extinction in 1768.

This article presents the common and scientific names for each species, along more information about the animal.  Where the species is unique to Alaska, this article presents a brief overview of the species.  Where the species is not unique to Alaska, this article gives information about the habits and distribution that are characteristic of animals occurring in the state.  The range maps that accompany the descriptions vary in their precision according to the sources on which they are based.  Readers are advised to click on the maps and examine the source information for more information on the species' ranges.

Eulipotyphlans
Eulipotyphlans are insectivorous mammals. Alaska shrews have not been studied as much as most of its animals, so many particulars of their distribution, breeding cycles, and population remain unknown.  Currently, ten species of shrews have been identified in Alaska, but debate remains over their identity and genetic relationships.  All of Alaska's shrew species look alike to lay observers, but experts differentiate them based on their ranges and skull structure.  Shrews live throughout the state, even on isolated islands, in habitats from temperate rain forests of the Southeast to Arctic tundra.  They generally eat insects, spiders, and other small invertebrates, though they may also eat other vertebrates and plants. Their predators in Alaska include weasels, marten, fox, domestic cats, other shrews, and owls. Shrews may be helpful in agricultural areas by eating insects, but elsewhere they may be pests by eating household meat left uncovered. None of Alaska's shrew populations is threatened, with the possible exception of the Pribilof Island shrew.

Bats
Bats are not abundant in Alaska, and are generally found only in Southeast Alaska, some of Southcentral Alaska, and in the Interior as far north as the Yukon River.

Carnivorans

Felids

Canids

Bears

Pinnipeds

Mustelids

Even-toed ungulates

Cetaceans

Lagomorphs

Rodents

See also
Wildlife of Alaska
List of mammals
List of regional mammals lists

References
List completeness checked against https://web.archive.org/web/20080105085514/http://curator.museum.uaf.edu/AKMammals/checklist.shtml.

External links
Key to small mammals of Alaska

Mammals
Alaska